Foonchewia is a genus of flowering plants belonging to the family Rubiaceae.

Its native range is Southeastern China.

Species:
 Foonchewia coriacea (Dunn) Z.Q.Song

References

Rubiaceae
Rubiaceae genera